Kendall Lamm (born June 5, 1992) is an American football offensive tackle for the Miami Dolphins of the National Football League (NFL). He played at Appalachian State for four years and was signed by the Houston Texans as an undrafted free agent in 2015.

College career
Kendall attended Butler High School in which he graduated and then went on to study at Appalachian State. He then graduated with a bachelor's degree in Communication-Public relations in December 2014. Kendall also held a top achievement of being a member of the Appalachian State athletics’ academic honor roll.

His first season with the Mountaineers in 2011 saw him play 8 out of 12 games. The four games that he had missed were due to an injury which caused him to miss 2 games and later on he was suspended for 2 games due to misconduct.

In his second year in 2012, Kendall saw more game time as he started 11-of-12 games at left tackle. The one game he did miss was due to a head injury sustained in training. Within the season, he was number one on the team with the highest season long job grade, 87%, and technique grade, 79%. Kendall also improved his behavior and conduct: In his second season, he did not commit a single penalty.

The last 2 seasons of his college career saw Kendall excelling and performing extremely well. He played in all 24 games and was recognized by many coaches as one of the best in the conference. As a right back tackle, he managed to record a total of 46 knockdowns in 2014 alone. He was praised to be an exceptional leader of an offensive line that managed to only allow 11 sacks all season. That is a record which is tied for 8th among the league. To close the 2014 season, Lamm led his team to a 6-game winning streak in which the offensive line led the attack for the Mountaineers to rush for 1,747 yards (291.2 ypg) and allowed only one sack. He also recorded a game in which he had a performance of the season in which he registered a total of 28 knockdowns and was charged with allowing only one sack all season.

Professional career

Houston Texans

Lamm signed with the Houston Texans as an undrafted free agent on May 8, 2015. After making the Texans roster as an undrafted rookie, Lamm played in 15 games with four starts in 2015. In 2016, he played in 15 games with three starts.

On October 28, 2017, Lamm was waived by the Texans, but was re-signed three days later.

In 2018, Lamm started 13 games at right tackle.

Cleveland Browns
On March 15, 2019, Lamm signed a two-year contract with the Cleveland Browns.

In Week 13 of the 2020 season against the Tennessee Titans, Lamm caught a one-yard touchdown pass from Baker Mayfield on a trick play during the 41–35 win.

Tennessee Titans

On March 18, 2021, Lamm signed a two-year contract with the Tennessee Titans. He was named a backup tackle in 2021, starting one game at left tackle.

On March 10, 2022, Lamm was released by the Titans.

Detroit Lions
On August 8, 2022, Lamm signed with the Detroit Lions. He was released on August 30.

Miami Dolphins
On November 28, 2022, Lamm was signed to the Miami Dolphins practice squad. He was promoted to the active roster on December 31.

On March 15, 2023, Lamm re-signed with the Dolphins.

References

External links
Cleveland Browns bio
Appalachian State Mountaineers bio

Living people
1992 births
Players of American football from Charlotte, North Carolina
American football offensive tackles
Appalachian State Mountaineers football players
Houston Texans players
Cleveland Browns players
Tennessee Titans players
Detroit Lions players
Miami Dolphins players